The 1928-29 season in Swedish football, starting August 1928 and ending July 1929:

Honours

Official titles

Competitions

Promotions, relegations and qualifications

Promotions

Relegations

Domestic results

Allsvenskan 1928–29

Division 2 Norra 1928–29

Division 2 Södra 1928–29

Division 2 promotion play-off 1928–29

Norrländska Mästerskapet 1929
Final

National team results

 Sweden: 

 Sweden: 

 Sweden: 

 Sweden: 

 Sweden: 

 Sweden: 

 Sweden: 

 Sweden: 

 Sweden:

National team players in season 1928/29

Notes

References
Print

Online

 
Seasons in Swedish football